Benjamin Smith House may refer to:

Benjamin Smith House (New Bern, North Carolina), listed on the NRHP in North Carolina
Benjamin Smith House (Columbus, Ohio), listed on the NRHP in Ohio